The Big Bend Ranges are a subrange of the Selkirk Mountains of the Columbia Mountains in southeastern British Columbia, Canada, located in Big Bend of the Columbia River north of the Illecillewaet River.

Sub-ranges
Adamant Range
Sir Sandford Range
Windy Range

References

Big Bend Ranges in the Canadian Mountain Encyclopedia